The Leaning Pine Arboretum is located on  on the north side of the California Polytechnic State University campus, in San Luis Obispo, central California. In 2022, the Arboretum  received a one-million-dollar gift from a former Provost and her husband.

Garden collections
Collections are arranged primarily by nativity and feature a diverse array of trees, shrubs, and other landscape plants appropriate for the Central Coast of California region. The gardens display hundreds of unique and intriguing plants, primarily from the Mediterranean forests, woodlands, and scrub Biome in the world's five Mediterranean climate regions located in areas of: Australia, California, Chile, the Mediterranean region, and South Africa. 

The arboretum also has a New Zealand garden, a Dwarf and Unusual Conifer garden, a Formal garden, and displays of cycads, palms, and numerous succulents.

Access

The Leaning Pine Arboretum is a living laboratory of plants for all to enjoy. Visitors are always welcome. The arboretum is open year around. Hours are from 8 a.m. to 5 p.m. Monday through Saturday, except for Cal Poly academic holidays. There is no admission fee. Pay parking is available nearby

Because plants change with the seasons, visitors are encouraged to return often to enjoy the many and varied highlights and vistas. Staff in the gift shop usually have a brochure-map of the gardens.

See also 
 List of botanical gardens and arboretums in California

References

External links 
   Calpoly.edu: official Leaning Pine Arboretum website

Arboreta in California
California Polytechnic State University
Parks in San Luis Obispo County, California